Djibouti requires its residents to register their motor vehicles and display vehicle registration plates. Current plates are European standard 520 mm × 110 mm.

References

Djibouti
Transport in Djibouti
Djibouti communications-related lists